Christopher Gauthier (born 27 January 1976) is an English-born Canadian actor best known for his work in Need for Speed: Carbon.

He had a recurring role on the SyFy Channel series Eureka, as Café Diem owner Vincent. While filming the final 10 episodes of season three of Eureka, he also filmed the 2009 CBS Mystery Event Harper's Island in which he appears as Malcolm Ross, and in Freddy vs. Jason as Shack.

Filmography

Film

Television

References 

English male film actors
English male television actors
English expatriates in Canada
Living people
21st-century English male actors
21st-century Canadian male actors
Canadian male film actors
Canadian male television actors
Canadian male voice actors
1976 births
Canadian people of English descent